WFTN may refer to:

 WFTN (AM), a radio station (1240 AM) licensed to Franklin, New Hampshire, United States
 WFTN-FM, a radio station (94.1 FM) licensed to Franklin, New Hampshire, United States